Sōichirō Tanaka may refer to:

, Japanese voice actor
, Japanese footballer